Scott Michaelson is an Australian retired actor and talent manager who is most famous for playing Brad Willis in Neighbours. He took over the role from Benjamin Grant Mitchell, who had been a guest character and later played Brad's cousin Cameron Hudson for over a year.

Roles
After appearing in Neighbours from 1991 to 1993, Michaelson also appeared on the New Zealand television series Shortland Street, also Paradise Beach, The New Adventures of Flipper and Sabrina Down Under. He guest starred in Hercules: The Legendary Journeys and Young Hercules as Apollo.

After leaving acting  Scott Michaelson became a talent manager and his most notable client was Holly Valance.

References

External links

Living people
Male actors from Melbourne
Australian male soap opera actors
Talent agents
Year of birth missing (living people)